Cherry Creek is an unincorporated community in Oneida County, Idaho, United States.

History
Cherry Creek's population was 150 in 1909.

References

Unincorporated communities in Oneida County, Idaho
Unincorporated communities in Idaho